Purmerend is the railway station in the centre of Purmerend, Netherlands. The station opened on 20 May 1884 as part of the Zaandam–Hoorn railway, extended to Enkhuizen in 1885. The original station building was demolished in 1957. The station building, built in 1958, was used until February 1, 2008, now has a small role as counter only open on weekdays from seven to eleven o'clock in the morning. Nowadays a Chinese restaurant is housed in the building.

Train services
The following services currently call at Purmerend:
2x per hour local service (sprinter) Hoofddorp - Schiphol - Zaandam - Hoorn Kersenboogerd

From December 2008, the direct connection with Amsterdam Centraal was lost, due to the Stoptrain 4500 becoming an Intercity, not stopping between Amsterdam Sloterdijk and Hoorn. Therefore, it is recommended to travel to Zaandam or Amsterdam Sloterdijk to get to the centre of Amsterdam.

The station is also served by two bus lines, 110 to Purmer North - Edam and Volendam and 103 to Purmer South - Broek in Waterland and Monnickendam.

External links
NS website 
Dutch Public Transport journey planner 

Railway stations opened in 1884
Railway stations in North Holland
Purmerend